Lunga, traditionally Lunca (everglade), is a village in the Dubăsari District of Transnistria, Moldova. It has since 1990 been administered as a part of the breakaway Pridnestrovian Moldavian Republic (PMR).

References

Villages of Transnistria
Tiraspolsky Uyezd
Dubăsari District, Transnistria